Uzana II of Pinya (also Uzana Pyaung, ; 1324/25 – September 1364) was king of Pinya for three months in 1364. He was merely a nominal king, and could not consolidate his power in the wake of the devastating raid by the northern Shan state of Mong Mao. He was overthrown in September 1364 by Thado Minbya of Sagaing.

Early life
Uzana was the eldest child of Princess Nan Lon Me of Pagan and Prince Kyawswa of Pinle. He was born  1324/25. A grandson of King Thihathu of Myinsaing–Pinya and King Kyawswa of Pagan, he hailed from both Myinsaing and Pagan royal lines. He had five full siblings (two younger brothers and three younger sisters) and at least two half-siblings. He grew up in Pinle but moved to Pinya with the entire family in 1344 when their father became the undisputed ruler of Pinya Kingdom.

Although he was the eldest son, Uzana lived in the shadow of his younger brothers. The king chose his second son Kyawswa the younger as his heir-apparent. The reason, according to the Yazawin Thit chronicle, was that Uzana had weak or crippled legs, and the king deemed his eldest son unsuitable to become king. Uzana continued to be overlooked when Kyawswa the younger became king in 1350 as Kyawswa II. Their youngest brother Narathu became the heir-presumptive, ahead of Uzana; Kyawswa II had no children.

Reign
It is not clear if Uzana's status changed when Narathu became king in 1359. But Uzana's turn came five years later. In May 1364, the raiders from the northern Shan state of Mong Mao (Maw) sacked Pinya, and took away Narathu, along with the loot. The next month, the court elected Uzana as king. The new king, now Uzana II, took his sister-in-law Saw Omma, who had been the chief queen consort of Kyawswa II and Narathu, as his chief queen. He was also married to Saw Sala of Sagaing.

Uzana II was merely a nominal king. He had little authority even in the core capital region. The Maw Shan raids had left the entire Central Burma, including Pinya's neighboring Sagaing Kingdom, in tatters. Like at Pinya, a new ruler, Thado Minbya, came to power at Sagaing. As both Pinya and Sagaing were branches of the Myinsaing dynasty, Uzana II and Thado Minbya were related: Thado Minbya was Uzana II's half-cousin, once removed. Unlike Uzana II, Thado Minbya proved to be an able leader, and quickly consolidated his power at Sagaing. He saw an opportunity to consolidate Central Burma, which had been split since 1315. In September 1364, Thado Minbya and his army crossed the Irrawaddy, and seized Pinya, apparently without a fight. The new king ordered the execution of Uzana.

Chronicle reporting differences
The various royal chronicles do not agree on his birth, death, and reign dates.

Ancestry

Notes

References

Bibliography
 
 
 
 
 

Myinsaing dynasty
Pinya dynasty
1364 deaths
1320s births
14th-century Burmese monarchs